

The National Guard Memorial Museum is a military museum hosted by the National Guard Educational Foundation. It is located in northwestern Washington, DC, near the National Postal Museum, Union Station and Georgetown University Law Center. Covering 5600 square feet, the museum features six different thematic galleries all relating to the National Guard of the United States:
 Militia Era
 The National Guard Comes of Age
 The Citizen Soldier in World War II
 Cold War Era
 National Guard in the Modern Era
 Closing Sequence.

The museum is a member of the United States Army Museum System.

References

Military and war museums in Washington, D.C.
History museums in Washington, D.C.
National Guard (United States)
+